Eugène Rose de Beauharnais (3 September 1781 – 21 February 1824) was a French nobleman, statesman, and military commander who served during the French Revolutionary Wars and the Napoleonic Wars.

Through the second marriage of his mother, Joséphine de Beauharnais, he was the stepson of Napoleon Bonaparte. Under the French Empire, he also became Napoleon's adopted son (but not the heir to the imperial throne). He commanded the Army of Italy during the Napoleonic Wars and was Viceroy of the Kingdom of Italy under his stepfather. Historians consider him one of Napoleon's most able relatives.

Early life and career
Eugène Rose de Beauharnais was born in Paris on 3 September 1781. A member of the House of Beauharnais, he was the son of Viscount Alexandre de Beauharnais and Joséphine Tascher de la Pagerie, both born in the French colony of Martinique. Alexandre was executed by guillotine in 1794, a few days before the end of the revolutionary Reign of Terror.

Eugène began his military career as a child, serving in the staff of General Lazare Hoche during the War in the Vendée, and fought at Quiberon. However, within a year his mother Joséphine had arranged his return to Paris, after she remarried to Napoleon Bonaparte. After joining the 1st Hussar Regiment as an assistant sub-lieutenant, Eugène served as aide-de-camp to his stepfather in the Italian campaigns of 1796–1797. In 1799, during the French campaign in Egypt and Syria, he took part in the Siege of Jaffa and was wounded during the Siege of Acre.

Eugène returned to France with Napoleon in the autumn of 1799, helping to bring about the reconciliation of the General and his mother, who had become estranged due to their mutual extramarital affairs. During the Coup of 18 Brumaire, he accompanied Napoleon to Saint-Cloud, where they brought the Council of Five Hundred into submission. When Napoleon became First Consul following the coup, Eugène was appointed captain of the Chasseurs à Cheval of the Consular Guard. With his squadron he took part in the Battle of Marengo where, though half his men fell, he led charge after charge.

After rising through the ranks under the Consulate, Eugène was promoted to brigade general soon after the establishment of the Empire in 1804. By a decree of 1 February 1805, Eugène was created Arch-Chancellor of State.

Viceroy of Italy

As commander of the Imperial Guard (successor to the Consular Guard), Eugène preceded his stepfather to Milan ahead of Napoleon's coronation as King of Italy on 26 May 1805. Napoleon had originally intended to place his brother Joseph on the Italian throne and then, after Joseph's refusal, his nephew Napoléon Charles, the son of Louis Bonaparte and Eugène's sister, Hortense. However, both Joseph and Louis refused, so Napoleon placed the Iron Crown upon his own head instead. During the coronation, Napoleon handed the royal ring and mantle to his stepson and on 7 June 1805 announced Eugène's appointment as Viceroy of Italy to the Italian Legislative Assembly.

During the War of the Fifth Coalition, Eugène was put in command of the Army of Italy with some highly competent generals like Grenier, Charpentier, and the future marshal MacDonald accompanying him as advisers and officers. In April 1809, he fought and lost the Battle of Sacile against the Austrian army of the Archduke John, but Eugène's troops won the rematch at the Battle of the Piave in May and the Battle of Raab in June. After the Battle of Aspern-Essling, Napoleon recalled the Army of Italy to Austria. After joining the main army on the island of Lobau in the Danube, Eugène took part in the Battle of Wagram.

Napoleon considered making Eugene regent of France during the Russian campaign but ultimately decided against this. During the campaign, Eugène again commanded the Army of Italy (IV Corps) with which he fought in the Battle of Borodino and the Battle of Maloyaroslavets. After Napoleon and then Joachim Murat had left the retreating army, Eugène took command of the remnants and led it back to Germany in 1813.

During the German campaign of 1813, Eugène took part in the Battle of Lützen. Napoleon then sent him back to Italy, where he organised the defence against the Austrians, holding out on the Mincio until Napoleon's abdication in 1814.

Later life
After the fall of Napoleon in 1814, Eugène retired to Munich at the behest of his father-in-law, King Maximilian I Joseph of Bavaria. He soon returned to Paris on the death of his mother, where he was honorably received by Louis XVIII and Alexander I of Russia. He immediately renounced his political activity and returned to his wife's family in Bavaria. Accordingly, he remained neutral during Napoleon's return to power in the Hundred Days.

As Duke of Leuchtenberg, Eugène lived his last years in Munich managing his estates and expanding his art collection. At the same time, he provided assistance for proscripts under the Bourbon Restoration, such as Antoine Marie Chamans de Lavalette, and lobbied for the alleviation of the harsh treatment imposed on Napoleon in his captivity in Saint-Helena. In 1822, Eugène's health began to deteriorate. After suffering two attacks of apoplexy in 1823, he died on 21 February 1824 in Munich, aged 42.

Roles and titles
On 14 June 1804 he was made an official member of the imperial family as His Imperial Highness, French Prince (Prince français) Eugène de Beauharnais. By a statute of 5 June 1805 the Emperor added Viceroy of Italy to his titles.

Eugène was adopted by Napoleon on 12 January 1806, though excluded from succession to the French Empire. On 16 February 1806, Eugène was declared heir presumptive to the Kingdom of Italy, in the absence of a second son of Napoleon. On 20 December 1807 he was given the title of Prince de Venise ("Prince of Venice"), a title created on 30 March 1806, when the Venetian Province taken from Austria in 1805 was united to Bonaparte's Kingdom of Italy.

In 1810, Napoleon used his influence over Karl von Dalberg, Archbishop of Regensburg and Grand Duke of Frankfurt, to name Eugène as constitutional heir of the grand duchy. Von Dalberg abdicated on 26 October 1813 due to Frankfurt's imminent conquest by the allied armies, and Eugène became nominal grand duke until Frankfurt was occupied by the allies in December of that same year.

A further imperial sinecure was Archichancelier d'État de l'Empire de France ("Archchancellor of State of the Empire of France").

His name is inscribed on Column 24 of the Southern Pillar of the Arc du Triomphe, reading BEAUHARNAIS.

Marriage and issue
On 14 January 1806, two days after his adoption by Napoleon, Eugène married Princess Augusta Amalia Ludovika Georgia of Bavaria (1788–1851), eldest daughter of Napoleon's ally, King Maximilian I Joseph of Bavaria. Although a diplomatic marriage, this union would turn out to be a happy one. On 14 November 1817, his father-in-law made him Duke of Leuchtenberg and Prince of Eichstätt, with the style Royal Highness.

Eugène and Augusta had seven children:
 Princess Joséphine Maximiliane Eugénie Napoléonne de Beauharnais (1807–1876); became the Queen Consort to King Oscar I of Sweden, himself the son of Napoleon's old love, Désirée Clary.
 Princess Eugénie Hortense Auguste de Beauharnais (1808–1847); married Friedrich, Prince of Hohenzollern-Hechingen.
 Prince Auguste Charles Eugène Napoléon de Beauharnais, 2nd Duke of Leuchtenberg (1810–1835); married Queen Maria II of Portugal. There was no issue from this marriage.
 Princess Amélie Auguste Eugénie Napoléone de Beauharnais (31 July 1812 – 26 January 1873); was the second wife of Pedro I of Brazil (father of Maria II of Portugal) and became Empress of Brazil.
 Princess Theodelinde Louise Eugénie Auguste Napoléone de Beauharnais (1814–1857); married Wilhelm, 1st Duke of Urach.
 Princess Carolina Clotilde de Beauharnais (1816)
 Prince Maximilian Josèphe Eugène Auguste Napoléon de Beauharnais (1817–1852); married Grand Duchess Maria Nikolaievna of Russia, eldest daughter of Tsar Nicholas I of Russia, and received the title of "Prince Romanovsky", addressed as "His Imperial Highness", in 1852.

Battle record
 Battle of Sacile (1809) - Defeat
 Battle of Caldiero (1809) - Defeat
 Battle of Piave River (1809) - Victory
 Battle of Tarvis (1809) - Victory
 Battle of Raab (1809) - Victory
 Battle of Borodino (1812) - Victory
 Battle of Maloyaroslavets (1812) - Indecisive
 Battle of Lützen (1813) - Victory
 Battle of Caldiero (1813) - Victory
 Battle of the Mincio River (1814) - Indecisive

Heraldry

References
Citations

Bibliography

 
 Oman, Carola Napoleon's viceroy, Eugène de Beauharnais London: Hodder & Stoughton, 1966.

External links

 Napoleon & Empire La franc-maçonnerie sous le Consulat et le Premier Empire 
 
 Heraldica.org - Napoleonic titles outside France
 
 
 

|-

1781 births
1824 deaths
Military personnel from Paris
French military personnel of the French Revolutionary Wars
Eugene
French commanders of the Napoleonic Wars
Italian commanders of the Napoleonic Wars
People of the First French Empire
Nobility from Paris
French generals
Members of the Sénat conservateur
Members of the Bavarian Reichsrat
Knights of the Golden Fleece of Spain
Eugene
Princes of Venice
Italian Freemasons
French Freemasons
Burials at St. Michael's Church, Munich
Prince-primate of the Confederation of the Rhine
Knights Grand Cross of the Order of the Sword
Names inscribed under the Arc de Triomphe